The San Biagio Chapel (cappella di San Biagio) is a Gothic chapel in the church of Santi Nazaro e Celso in Verona. It was begun in 1488 and completed in 1497 by the Confraternity of San Biagio to hold the relics of its patron Saint Blaise (bishop of Sebaste in Armenia) and Saint Juliana. It houses masterpieces by 15th century Veronese painters including Giovanni Maria Falconetto, Bartolomeo Montagna and Girolamo dai Libri.

History

The project was assigned to Beltrame di Valsolda, who was commissioned by the Confraternity and put in charge of the building works. However, the true design for the building may instead be attributed to the young painter Giovanni Maria Falconetto, who transformed the perception of the space with his painted architecture

References

External links
 
 

Roman Catholic churches in Verona
Gothic architecture in Veneto
Roman Catholic chapels in Italy